The oboe d'amore (Italian for "oboe of love"), less commonly , is a double reed woodwind musical instrument in the oboe family. Slightly larger than the oboe, it has a less assertive and a more tranquil and serene tone, and is considered the mezzo-soprano of the oboe family, between the oboe (soprano) and the cor anglais or English horn (alto). It is a transposing instrument, sounding a minor third lower than it is notated, i.e. in A. The bell is pear-shaped (called "Liebesfuß") and the instrument uses a bocal, similar to but shorter than that of the cor anglais.

Invention and use 
The oboe d'amore was invented in the eighteenth century and was first used by Christoph Graupner in his cantata  (1717). Johann Sebastian Bach wrote many pieces—a concerto, many of his cantatas, and the  movement of his Mass in B minor—for the instrument. Georg Philipp Telemann also frequently employed the oboe d'amore.

Its popularity waning in the late eighteenth century, the oboe d'amore fell into disuse for about 100 years until composers such as Richard Strauss (Symphonia Domestica, where the instrument represents the child), Claude Debussy (Gigues, where the oboe d'amore has a long solo passage), Maurice Ravel, Frederick Delius, and others began using it once again in the early years of the twentieth century. It can be heard in Toru Takemitsu's  (1984), but its most famous modern usage is, perhaps, in Ravel's Boléro (1928), where the oboe d'amore follows the E-flat clarinet to recommence the main theme for the second time. In his orchestration of Mussorgsky's Pictures at an Exhibition, Vladimir Ashkenazy uses the oboe d'amore to highlight the plaintive solo of the  movement.

Modern instruments 
Modern makers of oboes d'amore include Howarth of London (instruments in African blackwood or cocobolo wood), F. Lorée in Paris (instruments in African blackwood or violetwood) and others such as French makers , Fossati and Marigaux, Italian maker Bulgheroni (who offer instruments in grenadilla, violetwood, cocobolo, rosewood, palisander, and cocus wood), Japanese maker Joseph and German makers Püchner, Mönnig and Ludwig Franck. New instruments cost approximately £8,250 at 2016 prices (roughly $11,885 US), comparable to the cost of a new cor anglais. This cost, coupled with the limited call for the instrument, leads many oboists not to possess their own oboe d'amore, but to rent one when their work dictates the need. For the same reason, however, second-hand oboes d'amore surface from time to time with very little wear, demonstrating they were well loved (and yet with very little reduction in price over a new instrument).

References

External links 

, Gonzalo X. Ruiz, Concerto in A major for Oboe, BWV 1055R
 List of Compositions Featuring the Oboe d'amore on IMSLP page

Single oboes with conical bore
A instruments